Fiorella Bonicelli (born 21 December 1951) is a retired professional tennis player from Uruguay. She was born in Lima, Peru but grew up in Montevideo, Uruguay where she started playing tennis when at age 11.   During her career, she won the 1975 French Open mixed doubles title with Thomaz Koch. She also won the 1976 French Open women's doubles title with Gail Lovera, defeating Kathleen Harter and Helga Niessen Masthoff 6–4, 1–6, 6–3. At the Fed Cup, her singles record is 11–4, and doubles record 6–8. During her career, she reached one Grand Slam singles quarterfinal, at the 1978 French Open, where she lost to Virginia Ruzici in three sets.

Grand Slam finals

Doubles: (1 title)

Mixed doubles: (1 title)

References

External links
 
 
 

Uruguayan female tennis players
1951 births
Living people
Grand Slam (tennis) champions in women's doubles
Grand Slam (tennis) champions in mixed doubles
French Open champions
20th-century Uruguayan women
21st-century Uruguayan women